Cy Young, pitcher for the Boston Americans, pitched a perfect game against the Philadelphia Athletics by retiring all 27 batters he faced on Thursday, May 5, 1904. This event took place in the Huntington Avenue Grounds in Boston, Massachusetts, in front of 10,267 fans.

After Athletics' pitcher Rube Waddell defeated Young on April 25 and one-hit Boston on May 2, Waddell taunted Young to face him so that he could repeat his performance against Boston's ace. Three days later, Young pitched a perfect game against Waddell and the Athletics. The third perfect game in Major League Baseball history, Young's perfect game was the first in baseball's modern era and in American League history.

Background
Before Young, only two pitchers had thrown perfect games. Both occurred in 1880, when Lee Richmond and John Ward pitched perfect games within five days of each other, although under different rules from modern ones: the front edge of the pitcher's box was only  from home plate (the modern release point is about  farther away); walks required eight balls; and pitchers were obliged to throw side-armed. Young's perfect game was the first under the modern rules established in 1893.

Over 10,000 fans attended the May 5 game, as the Boston Americans hosted the Philadelphia Athletics, specifically because of the pitching matchup of Boston's Young and Rube Waddell of the Athletics. Waddell had outdueled Young on April 25, and then defeated the Americans, who challenged Waddell with Jesse Tannehill, as Waddell threw a one-hitter. Leading up to his rematch against Young, Waddell took to baiting Young in the press.

During the game, Waddell allowed at least one hit to every Boston batter, except for Young. Meanwhile, Boston's fielders, including Chick Stahl, Patsy Dougherty, and Buck Freeman, made excellent defensive plays behind Young. By the sixth inning, teammates began to avoid Young in between innings, following a long-standing tradition in baseball not to talk to a pitcher who was in the midst of pitching a no-hitter. The crowd cheered loudly in the ninth inning, as Young completed the perfect game by retiring Monte Cross, Ossee Schreckengost, and finally Waddell. After retiring Waddell, Young shouted, "How do you like that, you hayseed?" The game ended in one hour and 23 minutes.

Young had a streak of 45 scoreless innings pitched, which incorporated his perfect game. The streak began in the second inning of a game against Philadelphia on April 25, 1904, and continued through May 17, 1904. In addition to his perfect game, Young made scoreless appearances on April 30 and May 11, and added seven more scoreless innings to his streak before allowing runs to the Cleveland Naps in the eighth inning of the May 17 game. This set a then-Major League Baseball (MLB) record. Young also set an MLB record for the most consecutive innings pitched without allowing a hit, which lasted  innings, or 76 hitless batters. While Orel Hershiser has eclipsed Young's scoreless innings streak, Young's hitless streak remains the MLB record.

One year later, on July 4, 1905, Waddell beat Young and the Americans, 4–2, in a 20-inning contest. Young pitched 13 consecutive scoreless innings before he gave up a pair of unearned runs in the final inning. Young did not walk a batter and was later quoted as saying: "For my part, I think it was the greatest game of ball I ever took part in."

Game statistics
May 5, Huntington Avenue Grounds, Boston, Massachusetts

Box score

References

Bibliography

In-line citations

1904 Major League Baseball season
Major League Baseball perfect games
Boston Red Sox
Philadelphia Athletics
May 1904 sports events
1904 in sports in Massachusetts
Sports competitions in Boston
1900s in Boston